The 2009–10 season was Sporting Clube de Portugal's 76th season in the top flight, the Liga Sagres. This article shows player statistics and all matches (official and friendly) that the club have and will play during the 2009–10 season.

Squad

First team squad
As of 1 January 2010.

Youth Squad

 

(a) According to LPFP

UEFA Europa League squad
As of 14 September 2009.

List B Players included in UEFA

Transfers

In

Summer

Winter

UEFA Europa League

Group D

Results by round

Round of 32

|}

Round of 16

Carlsberg Cup

Third round

Group B

Knock-out stage

Semi-finals

Competitive

Liga Sagres
Kickoff times are in UTC+0.

UEFA Champions League
Play-off round

Fiorentina 3–3 Sporting CP on aggregate. Fiorentina won on away goals.

UEFA Europa League
Kickoff times are in CET.

Group Stage

Round of 32

Sporting CP won 4–2 on aggregate.
Round of 16

Atlético Madrid won 2–2 on aggregate from the away goals rule.

Pre-season and friendlies

References

Portuguese football clubs 2009–10 season
2010